Short Music for Short People is a 1999 compilation album released on the Fat Wreck Chords record label. It features 101 bands playing songs averaging approximately 30 seconds in length.

With a few exceptions, most of the album's tracks were written and recorded specifically for this release at the request of Fat Wreck Chords founder and NOFX bassist/vocalist Fat Mike. The compilation peaked at #191 on the Billboard 200.

Track listing
Due to limitations of the CD format, tracks 99–101 are indexed as one track.

See also
 Fat Wreck Chords compilations

References

Fat Wreck Chords compilation albums
Punk rock compilation albums
Hardcore punk compilation albums
1999 compilation albums